Peanut liqueur is a liqueur produced with peanuts.

History 
Rum is often used in the preparation of peanut liqueur, in which the spirit is infused with peanuts. Some varieties are produced with cream and simple syrup. Castries Crème is a brand of peanut liquor based upon rum that has the flavor of peanuts, brown sugar and cinnamon. Some peanut-infused vodkas are also produced, such as Van Gogh Vodka, NutLiquor and Peacasso. Peanut Lolita was an unpopular peanut-based dessert whiskey that was manufactured and sold in the United States in the 1960s until 1970s.

See also

 Brown Bomber (cocktail)
 List of liqueurs
 Peanut butter whiskey – peanut-flavored whiskey
 Peanut Lolita

References

Further reading

External links
 “Booze of the Week: Peanut Cream Liqueur”. Docaitta.

Liqueurs
Peanut dishes